Phaq'u Q'awa is a mountain in the Cordillera Occidental in the Andes of Bolivia, about  high. It is situated in the Oruro Department, Sajama Province, in the west of the Curahuara de Carangas Municipality, northwest of the extinct Sajama volcano. It lies south of Qullqi Warani.

The river Junt'uma K'uchu (Aymara  warm, hot,  water,  corner, "warm water corner", Junthuma Khuchu) originates north of Phaq'u Q'awa. It flows to the southeast as a right affluent of the Sajama River.

Name
The Hispanicized spelling is Pacocahua or Pajojañua.

References

Mountains of Oruro Department